The Canaan Union Depot, also known as the Union Depot, is located in Canaan Village, in the town of North Canaan, Connecticut, and is a former union station.  It was built in 1872 at the junction of the Housatonic Railroad and the Connecticut Western Railroad which was acquired by the Central New England Railway.

Architecture
The station was located at the level junction between the two rail lines, making an almost right angle at 85 degrees right at the crossover.  The angle of the building has a 3-story tower, at the top of which sat the electric telegraph operator.  The two 90-foot (27-meter) wings of the building were occupied by the two railroad companies. The first floor of the station had a large restaurant that was especially important before the development of the dining car. Eventually, both the Central New England and the Housatonic Railroad became a part of the New York, New Haven and Hartford Railroad. The New Haven was later merged into the Penn Central Transportation.

Decline
The station had been a junction and transfer point for passengers shifting from north-south NYNHH trains (Berkshire Division) to east-west CNE trains (mainline: Campbell Hall to Springfield and Hartford). Passenger service on the CNE line through the station ended in 1927 when the NYNHH acquired the CNE.

The station was no longer used for passenger service after 1971 when the Penn Central ended its unnamed successor to the Berkshire train, and regular freight service on the line ended in 1974.  The station then became a retail location, with a restaurant in the southeastern wing.  When the railroad was reopened as the new Housatonic Railroad in 1980, the station was not repurchased, though the new company did maintain offices there for many years.

The station was added to the National Register of Historic Places in 1972, and was also included in the Canaan Village Historic District in 1990.

More than half of the station — namely the southeast half — was destroyed by arson late in the evening of October 12, 2001.  The Connecticut Railroad Historical Association purchased what was left in 2003, and the organization began to restore it.  Part of the building shell and the tower were restored, but work then stalled for more than a decade due to red tape required to get grant money, and negations with the Housatonic Rail Road over safety issues.  The project got back on track in 2014.  The town of North Canann solicited bids for "Rehabilitation of the Union Deport Railroad Station" in August 2015.

Reborn
In December 2018, the Great Falls Brewing Company opened in the refurbished depot.

See also
National Register of Historic Places listings in Litchfield County, Connecticut

References

External links
 
 History of the Canaan Union Station, Connecticut Railroad Historical Association
 Railroad Station, Canaan, Connecticut (Nashua City Station)

Railway stations on the National Register of Historic Places in Connecticut
Union stations in the United States
Railway stations in the United States opened in 1872
Railway stations closed in 1974
Gothic Revival architecture in Connecticut
Stations along New York, New Haven and Hartford Railroad lines
Transportation buildings and structures in Litchfield County, Connecticut
Railroad stations in Litchfield County, Connecticut
North Canaan, Connecticut

Stations along Central New England Railway lines
Buildings and structures in the United States destroyed by arson
National Register of Historic Places in Litchfield County, Connecticut
Arson in Connecticut
1872 establishments in Connecticut
1974 disestablishments in Connecticut
Historic district contributing properties in Connecticut
Former railway stations in Connecticut